NHS South East Coast was a strategic health authority of the National Health Service in England.  It operated in the South East region, along with NHS South Central, providing coterminosity with the local government office region.

History
NHS South East Coast was established on 1 July 2006 as one of 10 Strategic Health Authorities (SHAs) in England.

Organisation
NHS South East Coast contained 26 NHS organisations, including 6 Foundation Trusts. These comprise: eight Primary Care Trusts; thirteen NHS Acute Trusts (hospitals); four Mental Health or Specialist Trusts; and one Ambulance Trust.

Primary care trusts
Primary care trusts were abolished in April 2013.

 Brighton and Hove City PCT
 East Sussex Downs and Weald PCT
 Eastern and Coastal Kent PCT
 Hastings and Rother PCT
 Medway PCT
 Surrey PCT
 West Kent PCT
 West Sussex PCT

Acute and foundation trusts

  Ashford and St Peter's Hospitals NHS Trust
 Brighton and Sussex University Hospitals NHS Trust
 Dartford and Gravesham NHS Trust
 East Kent Hospitals University NHS Foundation Trust
 East Sussex Hospitals NHS Trust
 Frimley Park NHS Foundation Trust
 Maidstone and Tunbridge Wells NHS Trust
 The Medway NHS Foundation Trust
 Royal Surrey County Hospital NHS Trust
 Royal West Sussex NHS Trust
 Surrey and Sussex Healthcare NHS Trust
 The Queen Victoria Hospital NHS Foundation Trust
 Worthing and Southlands Hospitals NHS Trust

References

External links 
Official website

South East Coast